Giannozzo Manetti (1396 – 1459) was an Italian politician and diplomat from Florence, who was also a  humanist scholar of the early Italian Renaissance.

Manetti was the son of a wealthy merchant. His public career began in 1428. He participated in municipal government as a member of the advisory council, as an ambassador, and in various gubernatorial positions in the city. Manetti was an eyewitness of the dedication of Santa Maria del Fiore on 25 March 1436, of which he  left a record, the Oratio de Secularibus et Pontificalibus Pompis in Consecratione Basilicae Florentinae. His views on Florentine relations with Venice proved unpopular among the ruling class, and he put himself into voluntary exile, spending the last years of his life in Naples.

He was a Latinist and a translator of Greek; he also studied Hebrew so that he could read the Hebrew Bible and the rabbinic commentaries. These readings convinced him that the Bible needed translation anew from the early manuscripts. After his death, Manetti's sizable library found its way into the Biblioteca Vaticana.

As an author, Manetti's style was an imitation of Cicero. He is now remembered principally as the author of De dignitate et excellentia hominis libri IV ("On the Dignity and Excellence of Man in Four Books"), completed in manuscript in 1452 or 1453. It was a response to Pope Innocent III's De miseria humane conditionis. His Pistoiese History, composed in 1446–47, was the first contemporary critical response to Leonardo Bruni's innovative and monumental History of the Florentine People. He also wrote a commentary on Aristotle and biographies of Dante Alighieri, Giovanni Boccaccio, Pope Nicholas V, Francesco Petrarca, Seneca, and Socrates.

Manetti's circle of humanist intellectuals included Carlo Marsuppini, Poggio Bracciolini, Leonardo Bruni, Francesco Filelfo, Niccolò Niccoli, Palla Strozzi, and Lorenzo Valla.

Bibliography
 Apologeticus, as A Translator's Defense ed. Myron McShane, Translated into English by Mark Young. Harvard University Press. 2015. [A defense of the study of Hebrew] 
 Biographical Writings, ed. Stefano U. Baldassarri and Rolf Bagemihl, I Tatti Renaissance Library, Cambridge, Mass., Harvard University Press, 2003. .
 De dignitate et excellentia hominis, ed. Elizabeth R. Leonard, Padua, Editrice Antenore, 1974. .
 De terremotu, ed. Daniela Pagliara, Florence, SISMEL-Edizioni del Galluzzo, 2012. .
 De vita ac gestis Nicolai quinti summi pontificis, ed. Anna Modigliani, Fonti per la storia d'Italia, Rome, Istituto storico italiano per il Medio Evo, 2005.  .
 Historia Pistoriensis, critical edition by Stefano Ugo Baldassarri and Benedetta Aldi, historical commentary by William J. Connell, Edizione Nazionale dei Testi della Storiografia Umanistica, Florence, SISMEL-Edizioni del Galluzzo, 2011. .
 On the Dignity of Man, in Two Views of Man: Pope Innocent III - On the Misery of Man ; Giannozzo Manetti - On the Dignity of Man, ed. and trans. Bernard Murchland, New York, Ungar, [1966].
 Un episodio del proto-humanismo español: tres opúsculos de Nuño de Guzmán y Giannozzo Manetti, ed. Jeremy N. H. Lawrence, Salamanca, Biblioteca española del Siglo XV-Diputaciòn de Salamanca, 1989.
 Vita Socratis et Senecae, ed. Alfonso De Petris, Florence: Leo S. Olschki, 1979.
 On Human Worth and Excellence, edited by Brian P. Copenhaver, Harvard University Press, 2018 (The I Tatti Renaissance Library, 85)

References

Baldassarri, Stefano Ugo (2008). Dignitas et excellentia hominis : atti del Convegno internazionale di studi su Giannozzo Manetti : Georgetown University-Kent State University, Fiesole-Firenze, 18-20 giugno 2007, Florence: Le Lettere. .
Connell, William J. (2002). "Il cittadino umanista come ufficiale nel territorio : una rilettura di Giannozzo Manetti," in Andrea Zorzi and William J. Connell, eds., Lo stato territoriale fiorentino (secoli XIV-XV) : ricerche, linguaggi, confronti : atti del seminario internazionale di studi, San Miniato, 7-8 giugno 1996, Pisa: Pacini, pp. 359–383.
Eck, Caroline (1998). "Giannozzo Manetti on Architecture: The Oratio de Secularibus et Pontificalibus Pompis in Consecratione Basilicae Florentinae of 1436". Renaissance Studies, 12:4, pp. 449–475.
Grout, Donald Jay, and Palisca, Claude V. (2001). A History of Western Music, 6th ed. New York: W. W. Norton & Co. . 
Smith, Christine and Joseph F. O'Connor (2006). Building the kingdom : Giannozzo Manetti on the material and spiritual edifice, Tempe: ACMRS.  .

External links

Manetti at Humanistic Texts
Selected works at Biblioteca Italiana

1396 births
1459 deaths
15th-century people of the Republic of Florence
Italian Renaissance writers
Christian Hebraists
Dante Alighieri
Ambassadors of the Republic of Florence